James Lamont Scott (born June 30, 1972) in Paterson, New Jersey is an American former professional basketball player.

High school career
Scott attended EastSide High School until 1991, where he played high school basketball. While he was in high school, he was named a McDonald's "All-American" Basketball Player.

College career
After graduating from EastSide High School in 1991, James attended Spartanburg Methodist, from 1991 to 1993, where he played Junior College basketball. He was a two-time Junior College "All-American". While playing JUCO basketball, he averaged 23 points, 10 rebounds, and 10 assists per game. Scott, along with Larry Johnson, a now retired former NBA player, who competed with the Charlotte Hornets and the New York Knicks, are the only two freshman players in Junior College basketball history to be named two-time "All-Americans". He graduated from the school with an associate degree in Criminal Justice.

Scott then played NCAA Division I college basketball at St. John's University, with the St. John's Red Storm, from 1993 to 1995.

Professional career
After not being selected in the 1995 NBA draft, Scott played overseas, with the French club BCM Gravelines, in the 1995–96 season. In the 1996–97 season, he played in eight games with the Miami Heat. He also played with clubs in Germany, Greece, Israel, Italy, Kosovo, Spain, Turkey, and Russia.

References

External links
St. John's University stats @ sports-reference.com

1972 births
Living people
ALM Évreux Basket players
American expatriate basketball people in France
American expatriate basketball people in Kosovo
American expatriate basketball people in Venezuela
American men's basketball players
Basketball players from Paterson, New Jersey
BCM Gravelines players
Eastside High School (Paterson, New Jersey) alumni
Élan Chalon players
Guaiqueríes de Margarita players
Junior college men's basketball players in the United States
Levallois Sporting Club Basket players
Miami Heat players
Montpellier Paillade Basket players
Oklahoma City Cavalry players
Olympique Antibes basketball players
Small forwards
St. John's Red Storm men's basketball players
Undrafted National Basketball Association players